Sergio Solmi (16 December 1899 – 7 October 1981) was an Italian poet, essayist and literary critic.

Born in Rieti, Solmi's studies mainly focused on French literature and on Italian contemporary literature. He released several collections of poetries, with a style influenced by hermeticism.

During his career Solmi was recipient of several literary awards, including the Bagutta Prize and two Viareggio Prizes.

References

External links  

1899 births
1981 deaths
People from Rieti
Italian essayists
Male essayists
Italian poets
Italian literary critics
20th-century Italian non-fiction writers
20th-century Italian male writers
Viareggio Prize winners
Italian male non-fiction writers
20th-century essayists